Rajesh Hamal is a Nepali film actor. He is regarded as one of the most influential and popular actors in the history of Nepalese cinema. He is popularly known as the "Maha Nayak" (megastar) of the Nepalese film Industry for being the highest-paid Nepali actor throughout the 1990s and early 2000s. He is the first Nepalese actor to receive popularity across South Asia, holding several box office records in Nepali cinema, including the most commercially successful film as lead actor, most consecutive hits, and most awards as an actor.

Hamal debuted as an actor in his uncle's film Yug Dekhi Yug Samma in 1988, which was a huge hit and made him a nationwide star. But the 1991 blockbuster Deuta marked a turning point in his career and launched Hamal to superstar status. Since then, he has appeared in over 200 films in a career spanning nearly three decades. He is widely regarded as one of the most influential personalities in Nepali cinema and was the most dominant actor throughout the 1990s and 2000s. Some of the other blockbusters featuring Hamal include Kasam (1992), Sadak and Prithvi (1994), Simana (1996), Shankar (1997), Chadni and Ek Number Ko Pakhe (1999), Basanti (2000), Dhukdhuki (2000), Hami Tin Bhai (2004), and Ajambari Naataa (2005). He also hosted the first season of Nepali version of Who Wants to Be a Millionaire? titled as Ko Bancha Crorepati (2019).

Personal life 
Rajesh Hamal was born on 9 June 1964. His father, Chuda Bahadur Hamal, was the Nepali ambassador to Pakistan, Hamal did not communicate much with his father, telling Wavemag, "Every day of my life, I regret not bidding him with a proper goodbye. Additionally, I should have made an effort to properly communicate with my father, and talk about my aspirations and passion in a better way."

Hamal is a son of a diplomat. Hamal spent most of the time of his childhood in Nepal, where he attended private school till grade 8. In his early teen, he went to Moscow with his father. Hamal and his father remained in Russia for numerous years. He also started attending college in Russia itself. He then came to Chandigarh, India to finish his further education at Panjab University. At Punjab University itself, he completed his M.A in English literature.

Hamal is currently married to Madhu Bhattarai. They first met at the Lux Beauty Pageant in 2004. Hamal proposed to Bhattarai on 14 May, then he got married on 24 May 2014 in a private wedding ceremony at Hotel Annapurna, Kathmandu. Hamal said he was impressed by Bhattarai's talent at the Lux Beauty Pageant in 2004. Bhattarai was nervous to see her favorite actor as a judge that she couldn't answer his questions properly. Hamal and Bhattarai managed to keep their relationship secret for five years; the couple admitted they were in a relationship for two years before getting married. He married in a private ceremony at Hotel Annapurna, Kathmandu, but he threw a reception party with more than 1000 guests. He married at an odd age because he felt pressure from his family as well as fans. Hamal and his wife Madhu don't have any children as of now. There are few known hobbies of Rajesh Hamal besides acting.

Career

Acting career 
Before entering the film industry, Hamal modeled for a magazine in India named Fashion Net whilst studying at University of Delhi. He appeared in a fashion show organised by the Indian Embassy Women Association in the late 1980s.

Hamal's first starring role was set to be in Bhagya Rekha (1987) opposite Karishma Manandhar. Later, Manandhar left the project, which led Kristi Mainali to join the project. After Mainali joined the filming began, however, after the film director Deepak Rayamajhi was rumored to suspect an affair between the lead actors, which led two of the lead actors to leave the project. Both were replaced by Rabindra Khadka and Mausami Malla. After the film's release, it became a blockbuster; the film also led the film director Deepak Rayamajhi to become a credible film director in the early Nepali cinema industry.

The affair between Kristi Mainali and Hamal became highly popular throughout Nepal, and after Deepak Rayamajhi's successful film directing debut, he signed Mainali and Hamal into his next project titled Yug Dekhi Yug Samma (1988). The film follows two young couples who are amidst the pressure of their family rivalries. In addition to the lead actors' debut, it was also the film producer Chhabiraj Ojha, and action director Rajendra Khadgi's film debut too. Hamal later told Teenz, "Actually somewhere inside I always wanted to act. More than acting, I was fascinated by films. I wanted something in the field, but I did not know how to begin. Luckily, my cousin was a part of the film industry and he offered me a role. That was in 1987, and at that time. I did not know I would be doing films for the next 20 years". After the success of the film, it was later remade with the same title in 2009, directed by Dipendra K Khanal, and the film starred Nandita K.C., and Hamal in the lead roles.

In 1991, Hamal joined up with Tulsi Ghimire for the first time, in his directorial film project called Deuta. The film starred Hamal in the lead role, while the film also starred Shrawan Ghimire, Srijana Basnet, and Tulsi Ghimire in the supporting roles. Upon the film's release, it became a super hit at the box office of Nepal. The film is also considered the film that launched his stardom in the Nepali film industry. The Kathmandu Post wrote, "Incidentally, this was also the film that catapulted Hamal into stardom and while that alone could place Deuta in a Kollywood Hall of Fame (if such a thing existed), the movie is much more than that".

In 2000, Hamal was cast in actor Neer Shah's directorial film titled Basanti (2000). In the film Hamal portrayed the role of Gagan Singh Khawas, alongside Hamal appeared with Karishma Manandhar, Gauri Malla, and Divya Dutta. The film is based on the novel of the same written by Diamond Shumsher Rana. Hamal considers his favourite film to be Deuta (1991), and Basanti (2000). Bijaya Adhikari of OnlineKhabar wrote, "However, filmmakers like Nir Shah, one of the forerunners of the historical period drama genre, has been consistently making successful films in the genre like Basanti, Masaan and Seto Bagh." Rachana Chettri, and Preena Shrestha of The Kathmandu Post also wrote, "Cinematographically, the film achieves its purpose of bringing the old palaces and courtyards populated by royals and their supporters back to life."

Then in 2004, Hamal appeared in a Shiva Regmi directorial film named Hami Tin Bhai (2004). The film starred an ensemble cast of Shree Krishna Shrestha, Nikhil Upreti, Jharana Thapa, Nandita K.C., and Rekha Thapa. In 2018 it was announced the sequel of the film.

However, Rajesh Hamal did not restrict his career to only movies. He as well started appearing on Television shows and advertisements in 2004. A popular Nepalese show called Wai Wai Quiz Whiz is his first-ever television appearance. He also had a guest appearance on Miss Angel Program in the same year. In the early 2000s, Hamal got endorsed by various companies to star in advertisements, and commercials, as well as he was discerned alongside numerous products comprising steel, soap, investment company, bank as well as cement. However, his focus on cinema and appearing on them was always intact. He also endorses the first bike which is made in Nepal called Cosmic Ying Yang and he has also been a face of NMB bank, Indica Easy, Global College of Management.

Television hosting 
Hamal has twice been judge for Miss Nepal, once in 1997 with Kamal Rupakheti, Laxmi Keshari Manandhar, and Sanjaya Agarwal, the event was won by Jharana Bajracharya. After 10 years later he was the chief judge of Miss Nepal 2007, he judged alongside Malvika Subba, and Bhusan Dahal, the event was won by Sitashma Chand. In 2019, he was hosting the Nepali version of Who Wants to Be a Millionaire?.

In the media 
Hamal is often referred to as "Mahanayak", and "Rajesh Dai". Karishma Manandhar, Nepali actress said, if Hamal ran for Mayor of Kathmandu she would vote for him.

In July 2019 Hamal was compared to Indian actors Amitabh Bachchan, and Shah Rukh Khan by Indian media Aaj Tak. Aaj Tak wrote, "Rajesh is such a superstar who has conferred with the title of megastar. Also Rajesh who is 57-years-old is still popular among Nepali film enthusiast which is similar to the fandom of Bollywood super stars —Amitabh and Shahrukh Khan".

Hamal is ceaselessly acting and he has not provided any sign of retirement. However, he has been less active after the wedding as a result of he might need to be chosen to quiet down however his fame and name are going to be carried to varied generations to return. He is renowned to own set standards high for varied reasons. The primary reason is that he has this ability in a vast array of roles. He did not limit himself to only one kind of character. That showed his versatility which won him numerous awards that depicted his personality throughout a decade. Another reason is that he has created the associate look in additional than 200 films until these days. One more reason is that Hamal has increased the cinematic standards by his ability and talent. There is no denying his skillful acting because he has been honored with various nominations and awards. In the year 1998, the Nepalese government gave him an honor for his contribution to Nepali cinema. He received an honorable mention from the National Human Right commission from the year 2000–2003 and also from the late King Birendra as well as the Armed Police Force. He constantly got official honors from the Federation of Nepali Journalists. The latest honor he received was provided by then-President Dr. Rambaran Yadav in the year 2015. Hamal is known as an icon for any Nepali film industry enthusiast, director, and actor. Not just Nepal, he has become an iconic figure in 36-24-36 other countries as well. His dedication and commitment can be justified by his numerous successful years. The film career of Rajesh Hamal might not be as active as before but that doesn't mean his impact in the industry also doesn't exist. Not only Nepal is influenced by Rajesh Hamal, but he has also impacted wider scope, earning the respect of many other influential people in the film industry.

In response to 2015 earthquake, Rajesh Hamal joined the initiative called Building Back right who acted as a Goodwill ambassador. That initiative was sponsored partly by Oxfam Nepal, a global confederation of non-profit organizations as well as aims to alleviate the plight of various women as well as children who were left homeless. This initiative intends to help in the restoration of Nepal in the destructive situation transpired by tragic earthquakes and thousands of aftershocks.

Recently, Hamal has been the victim of a death hoax. On 14 May, one leading news portal reported about his death that took the nation by a minor storm, However, the news was false as Hamal himself clarified it to be just a hoax. It was reported that his car was hit by a huge truck. Hamal told the audience that people should be careful while writing such sensitive news and they shouldn't misuse their right to information.

Awards and nominations

Filmography

References

External links
 
Rajesh Hamal at Film Development Board

20th-century Nepalese dancers
20th-century Nepalese male actors
20th-century Nepalese male singers
21st-century Nepalese dancers
21st-century Nepalese male actors
21st-century Nepalese male singers
Living people
Male voice actors
Nepalese businesspeople
Nepalese film producers
Nepalese game show hosts
Nepalese male dancers
Nepalese male film actors
Nepalese male models
Nepalese male stage actors
Nepalese male television actors
Nepalese television presenters
Nepalese voice actors
People from Tansen, Nepal
Year of birth missing (living people)